The 2003 All-Ireland Senior Camogie Championship Final was the 72nd All-Ireland Final and the deciding match of the 2003 All-Ireland Senior Camogie Championship, an inter-county camogie tournament for the top teams in Ireland.

Cork led 0-7 to 1-3 at half-time but Tipp rallied to win by a goal to regain the O'Duffy Cup and avenge the previous year's defeat.

References

All-Ireland Senior Camogie Championship Finals
All-Ireland Senior Camogie Championship Final
All-Ireland Senior Camogie Championship Final
All-Ireland Senior Camogie Championship Final, 2003